FDU-NNE1 (also known as FDU-NNEI and FDU-MN-24) is an indole-based synthetic cannabinoid that is presumed to be a potent agonist of the CB1 receptor and has been sold online as a designer drug. Given the known metabolic liberation (and presence as an impurity) of amantadine in the related compound APINACA, it is suspected that metabolic hydrolysis of the amide group of FDU-NNE1 will release 1-naphthylamine, a known carcinogen.

See also 

 5F-NNE1
 5F-PB-22
 AM-2201
 BB-22
 FUB-JWH-018
 AB-FUBINACA
 ADB-FUBINACA
 AMB-FUBINACA
 FUB-144
 FUB-APINACA
 FUB-PB-22
 MDMB-FUBICA
 MDMB-FUBINACA
 NNE1
 PB-22

References 

Designer drugs
Fluoroarenes
Indolecarboxamides
Naphthoylindoles